Nurul Alyani Binti Jamil (born 1993), is a Malaysian international lawn bowler.

Bowls career

World Championships
In 2020 she was selected for the 2020 World Outdoor Bowls Championship in Australia.

World Singles Champion of Champions
Jamil was runner-up to Jo Edwards in the 2018 World Singles Champion of Champions.

Other events
Jamil won two silver medals at the 2019 Asia Pacific Bowls Championships in the Gold Coast, Queensland in the triples and fours and won two gold medals in the fours (2017) and pairs (2019) in the Lawn bowls at the Southeast Asian Games.

In 2023, she won the singles and triples gold medals at the 14th Asian Lawn Bowls Championship in Kuala Lumpur.

References 

Malaysian female bowls players
Living people
1993 births
Southeast Asian Games medalists in lawn bowls
Southeast Asian Games gold medalists for Malaysia
Competitors at the 2017 Southeast Asian Games
Competitors at the 2019 Southeast Asian Games
21st-century Malaysian women